Arielle Twist is a Nehiyaw (Cree) multidisciplinary artist and sex educator based in Halifax, Nova Scotia located in Canada. She is originally from George Gordon First Nation in Saskatchewan. and identifies as a Two-Spirit, transgender woman She was mentored in her early career by writer Kai Cheng Thom and has since published a collection of poems in 2019 in her book Disintegrate / Dissociate, began working as a sex educator at Venus Envy and become an MFA candidate at OCAD University Graduate Studies in the Interdisciplinary Art, Media and Design (IAMD) program. Twist has also expanded her artistry past poetry into visual and performance art. Over her time as an artist, Arielle Twist has had her work featured in Khyber Centre for the Arts, Toronto Media Arts Centre, La Centrale Galerie Powerhouse, Centre for Art Tapes, Art Gallery of Mississauga, Art Gallery of Nova Scotia, and Agnes Etherington Art Centre. Twist has also won the Indigenous Voices Award for English poetry and the Dayne Ogilvie Prize for emerging LGBTQ writers in 2020.

Career

Writing 
Arielle Twist began writing in 2017 after being encouraged by her mentor Kai Cheng Thom whom she met at Thom’s book launch at Venus Envy. Twist went on to publish the essay "What It's Like to Be a Native Trans Woman on Thanksgiving" in Them on November 23, 2017. After their publishing debut, Twist went on to perform her first poetry reading at Venus Envy alongside her mentor. She also attended the Naked Heart festival in Toronto and began a residency at the Banff center where she debuted her first poems. Arielle met Billy-Ray Belcourt during her Banff Centre who guided her through her first manuscript. Twist debuted as an author with a collection of thirty-eight poems in her book Disintegrate / Dissociate published on June 4, 2019 by Arsenal Pulp Press. The book focuses on "human relationships, death, and metamorphosis". Her poems, which have been described as raw, confrontational, and eloquent, examine themes of colonization, kinship, displacement, and transmisogyny. About her writing, Twist states that "It feels like the most vulnerable thing [she has] ever done". Twist says Disintegrate / Dissociate is about "love, loss, and grief" as well as her coping with her trauma through dissociation. The poem "Manifest" in the book was dedicated to editor Billy-Ray Belcourt who also held residency at the Banff Centre while Twist was there. In late 2019, Arielle also contributed to the Together Apart Series. Twist's book publication along with her collection of essays has earned Twist recognition and awards including the Dayne Ogilvie Prize for LGBTQ Emerging Writers from the Writers' Trust of Canada and the Indigenous Voices Award for English poetry in 2020.

Published work and exhibitions

Awards and nominations

References

21st-century Canadian poets
21st-century Canadian women writers
21st-century First Nations writers
Canadian women poets
First Nations poets
First Nations women writers
LGBT First Nations people
Canadian LGBT poets
Transgender poets
Two-spirit people
Writers from Saskatchewan
Living people
Year of birth missing (living people)
George Gordon First Nation
21st-century Canadian LGBT people